"Blame It on Your Love" is a song by English singer and songwriter Charli XCX featuring American singer and rapper Lizzo. It was released on 15 May 2019 as the second single from Charli XCX's third studio album, Charli, and soon after debuted on BBC Radio 1 as Annie Mac's "Hottest Record in the World". It is Charli XCX's first single since her 2018 collaboration with Troye Sivan, "1999". The single is a reworked version of "Track 10" the final track from Charli XCX's mixtape Pop 2 (2017). The music video was released on 13 June 2019.

Background and "Track 10"
"Track 10" is the final track of Charli XCX's mixtape Pop 2 (2017). "Blame It on Your Love" is a reworking of the track with additional vocals from Lizzo. "Track 10" was highly acclaimed upon the release of Pop 2, with Pitchfork placing the song at 92 on its list of the 100 Best Songs of 2018 and 85 on its list of the 200 Best Songs of the 2010s. In April 2022, Clash named "Track 10" among the 17 best of Charli's songs, with Ruby Carter claiming that "it helped solidify her image of 'Charli 2.0', on the heels of her Vroom Vroom EP."

Promotion
Charli XCX tweeted on 13 May 2019 that she had a "bop" with Lizzo, whom she called the "queen of everything", "coming this week". Less than a day later, she confirmed the title and release date, posting a picture of herself with Lizzo, who is holding a sign saying "Bout 2 Save Pop Music". The song was premiered as the "Hottest Record in the World" on BBC Radio 1 on 15 May 2019, with Charli XCX also being interviewed by Annie Mac.

Track listing
Digital download
"Blame It on Your Love" – 3:11

Digital download – Dylan Brady Remix
"Blame It on Your Love" (Dylan Brady Remix) – 4:00

Digital download – Seeb and kid joki Remix
"Blame It on Your Love" (Seeb and kid joki Remix) – 3:06

Digital download – Stripped
"Blame It on Your Love" (Stripped) – 3:16

Digital download – Kat Krazy Remix
"Blame It on Your Love" (Kat Krazy Remix) – 2:30

Digital download – Back N Fourth Remix
"Blame It on Your Love" (Back N Fourth Remix) – 2:46

Digital download − Remix EP
"Blame It on Your Love" (Back N Fourth Remix) – 2:46
"Blame It on Your Love" (Stripped) – 3:16
"Blame It on Your Love" (Kat Krazy Remix) – 2:30
"Blame It on Your Love" (Seeb and kid joki Remix) – 3:06
"Blame It on Your Love" (Dylan Brady Remix) – 4:00

Personnel
Credits adapted from Tidal.

"Blame It on Your Love"
Charli XCX – lead vocals
Lizzo – featured vocals
Stargate – production, arrangement, drums, guitar, piano, synthesizer, programming, recording
A. G. Cook – additional production
Finn Keane – additional production
Thomas Warren – recording
Mark "Spike" Stent – mixing
Matt Wolach – additional mix engineering
Michael Freeman – additional mix engineering
Stuart Hawkes – mastering

"Track 10"
Charli XCX – lead vocals
Noonie Bao – backing vocals
A. G. Cook – production, executive production, programming, synthesizer
Stargate – production, vocal production
Life Sim – production, synthesizer
Lil Data – production, synthesizer
Geoff Swan – mixing
Stuart Hawkes – mastering

Charts

Release history

References

2019 singles
2019 songs
Charli XCX songs
Lizzo songs
Songs written by Charli XCX
Songs written by Noonie Bao
Songs written by Sasha Alex Sloan
Songs written by Mikkel Storleer Eriksen
Songs written by Tor Erik Hermansen
Songs written by Lizzo
Song recordings produced by Stargate (record producers)
Tropical house songs